National Conservatory of Music may refer to:

 Conservatoire national supérieur de musique et de danse de Lyon, in Lyon, France
 Conservatoire de Paris
 Conservatorio Nacional Superior de Música (Argentina) in Buenos Aires
 National Conservatory of Music of Mexico
 National Conservatory of Music of America, a school founded by Jeannette Thurber in New York City in 1885